Westraltrachia is a genus of land snails in the family Camaenidae.

Distribution
This genus of land snails occurs in the northern coastal area of  Western Australia.

Species include:
 Westraltrachia alterna
Westraltrachia ampla
Westraltrachia ascita
Westraltrachia commoda
Westraltrachia cunicula
Westraltrachia derbyi
Westraltrachia froggatti
 Westraltrachia inopinata
 Westraltrachia instita
 Westraltrachia lievreana
Westraltrachia limbana
Westraltrachia oscarensis
Westraltrachia pillarana
 Westraltrachia porcata
 Westraltrachia recta
 Westraltrachia rotunda
 Westraltrachia subtila
Westraltrachia tropida
Westraltrachia turbinata
Westraltrachia woodwardi

References
 
 Iredale, T. 1933. Systematic notes on Australian land shells. Records of the Australian Museum 19: 37-59
 Solem, A. 1984. Camaenid land snails from Western and Central Australia (Mollusca : Pulmonata : Camaenidae). IV. Taxa from the Kimberley, Westraltrachia Iredale, 1933 and related genera. Records of the Western Australian Museum, Supplement 17: 427-705

 
Camaenidae
Gastropods of Australia
Taxonomy articles created by Polbot